Richard Nathan Haass (born July 28, 1951) is an American diplomat. He has been president of the Council on Foreign Relations since July 2003, prior to which he was Director of Policy Planning for the United States Department of State and a close advisor to Secretary of State Colin Powell in the George W. Bush administration. In October 2022, Haass announced he would be departing from his position at CFR in June 2023. He'll be succeeded by former U.S. Trade Representative Michael Froman.

The Senate approved Haass as a candidate for the position of ambassador and he has been U.S. Coordinator for the Future of Afghanistan. He succeeded George J. Mitchell as the United States Special Envoy for Northern Ireland to help the peace process in Northern Ireland, for which he received the State Department's Distinguished Service Award.

At the end of 2003, Mitchell Reiss succeeded him as special envoy. In late 2013, Haass returned to Northern Ireland to chair inter-party talks aimed at addressing some of the unresolved issues from the peace process such as parades, flags, and "the past" (now known as "the Troubles").

Early life and education 
Haass was born to a Jewish family in Brooklyn, the son of Marcella (née Rosenthal) and Irving B. Haass. Haass graduated from Roslyn High School in 1969. His father was a securities analyst and partner at investment manager David J. Greene & Co. He completed a bachelor's degree at Oberlin College in 1973, and was a Rhodes scholar at Oxford University, where he completed a master's degree and doctoral degree in 1978.

Career
Haass served at the Department of Defense from 1979 to 1980, and at the Department of State from 1981 to 1985. From 1989 to 1993, he was Special Assistant to United States President George H. W. Bush and National Security Council Senior Director for Near East and South Asian Affairs. In 1991, Haass received the Presidential Citizens Medal for helping to develop and explain U.S. policy during Operation Desert Shield and Operation Desert Storm.

Richard Haass worked for Secretary of State Colin Powell in the Bush administration and was Director of Policy Planning for the US State Department from 2001 to 2003 during the lead-up to the Iraq war. Haass has said he was 60 percent against the Iraq war.

Haass's other postings include Vice President and Director of Foreign Policy Studies at the Brookings Institution, the Sol M. Linowitz Visiting Professor of International Studies at Hamilton College, a senior associate at the Carnegie Endowment for International Peace, a Lecturer in Public Policy at Harvard University's Kennedy School of Government, and a research associate at the International Institute for Strategic Studies.

Throughout the 2008 presidential campaign, Haass advised several members of both the Republican Party and Democratic Party on issues regarding foreign policy, but did not publicly endorse a candidate due to the Council on Foreign Relations' non-partisan stance.

In September 2013, Haass returned to Northern Ireland, with Professor Meghan O'Sullivan, to chair all party talks on flags, parades and the legacy of The Troubles, after violence flared over the removal of the union flag at Belfast City Hall. The talks broke down on December 31, 2013.

Haass is a member of the Inter-American Dialogue.

Foreign policy views 
In a May 2015 interview with BBC's HARDtalk, speaking as President of the Council on Foreign Relations, Haass predicted a new era in world history, in part due to the muting of U.S. dominance by the more diffuse power wielded by states and non-state entities as a result of the proliferation of nuclear arms and cyberterrorism, and several policy failures, which may bring about an "era of disorder" in the absence of any clear superpower.

On October 4, 2017, Haass called for U.S. Secretary of State Rex Tillerson to resign.

In December 2021, Haass criticized the Biden administration's withdrawal from Afghanistan as “America-first unilateralism in practice," indicating that Biden “did so in a Trumpian way, consulting minimally with others and leaving NATO allies to scramble.”

Personal life
Haass lives in New York City with his wife, Susan Mercandetti; they have two children.

Books 
Haass is the author or editor of thirteen books on American foreign policy and one book on management.

Books authored

 
 The World: A Brief Introduction. Penguin Press, 2020. .
 A World in Disarray: American Foreign Policy and the Crisis of the Old Order. Penguin Press, 2017. .
 Foreign Policy Begins at Home: The Case for Putting America's House in Order. Basic Books, 2014. .
 War of Necessity, War of Choice: A Memoir of Two Iraq Wars. Simon & Schuster, 2010. .
 Co-authored with Martin Indyk (2008). Restoring the Balance: A Middle East Strategy for the Next President. Brookings Institution Press. .
 The Opportunity. PublicAffairs, 2006. .
 Intervention: The Use of American Military Force in the Post-Cold War World. Carnegie Endowment for International Peace, 1999. .
 The Bureaucratic Entrepreneur: How to Be Effective in Any Unruly Organization. Brookings Institution Press, 1999. .
 Economic Sanctions and American Diplomacy. Council on Foreign Relations Press, 1998. .
 The Reluctant Sheriff: The United States After the Cold War.  Council on Foreign Relations Press, 1997. .
 The Power to Persuade. Houghton Mifflin, 1994. .
 Conflicts Unending: The United States and Regional Disputes. Yale University Press, 1990. .

Books edited
 Transatlantic Tensions: The United States, Europe, and Problem Countries. Brookings Institution Press, 1999. .
 Superpower Arms Control: Setting the Record Straight, edited with Albert Carnesale. Ballinger Publishing Company, 1987. .

Book contributions
 "War Can Be Justified When It Is the Best Policy Option". War. Detroit: Greenhaven Press, 2014, pp. 22–26. .

Filmography
Haass has appeared as himself on dozens of TV shows and documentaries since 1996. He has served as consultant on NBC News and hosted the online international affairs forum of the New York Times.

Following the publication of A World in Disarray in 2017, the book was adapted into a feature-length documentary by VICE for release the same year on July 21. Through interviews with Haass and other policymakers academics associated with the Council, the film explores the themes and concepts laid out in the book: the disorder in today’s international landscape, how it arose, and how it plays out in Syria, Ukraine, the South China Sea, and North Korea. In addition to providing commentary throughout the film, Haass served as a consulting producer.

Explanatory notes

References

External links 

 Richard Haass — History Commons
 What to do with American Primacy
 State sovereignty must be altered in globalized era; An Article written by Richard Haass on the age of globalization.
 Council of Foreign Relations President Profile
 
 
 
 
 Works by Richard Haass at Internet Archive
 Works by Richard Haass at JSTOR

|-

1951 births
20th-century American Jews
21st-century American Jews
American diplomats
American Rhodes Scholars
Directors of Policy Planning
Harvard Kennedy School staff
Living people
Members of the Inter-American Dialogue
Oberlin College alumni
People from Brooklyn
Politics of Northern Ireland
Presidential Citizens Medal recipients
Presidents of the Council on Foreign Relations
United States National Security Council staffers
United States Special Envoys